California Military Institute is a publicly funded charter school located in Perris, California, which serves grades 5–12. It is attended by 1100 students. It is part of the Perris Union High School District. The California Military Institute is also known by its abbreviation: CMI. C.M.I's mascot is Theodore "Teddy" Roosevelt's Rough Riders. Students are affiliated with the California Cadet Corps.

The California Military Institute is now given free uniforms from the CACC, because of this students no longer have to pay for their uniforms. Highschool students are required to wear the uniform ACU. Middle School/Elementary School students are required to wear the Class C uniform. All students must wear a Class B uniform on the required day as well. C.M.I is visited constantly throughout the year by many military branches, especially during the Pass-n-Review C.M.I has once every semester.

C.M.I does not just focus on the military side of the school but also offers a variety of sports students can try-out for. These sports are also offered to middle school and elementary students.

References

Charter preparatory schools in California
High schools in Riverside County, California
2003 establishments in California